Tüp or Tyup  is a large village in the Issyk-Kul Region of Kyrgyzstan, and the center of the Tüp District. It was established as village Preobrazhenskoye in 1870. Its population was 12,355 in 2021. Tüp is a road junction town at the northeast corner of Lake Issyk Kul. To the west on A363 is Anan'yevo and to the south Karakol. To the east, A362 leads up the Karkara valley to Kazakhstan.

The Karkara ('black crane') Valley leads east from here about 60 km to Kazakhstan between the Kyungey Ala-Too to the north and the Central Tian Shan to the south.  There is an annual horse festival. Halfway up the valley is the village of San-Tash (counting stones).  It is said that Tamerlane once ordered each of his soldiers to place a stone in a pile as they passed.  When they returned, each soldier was to remove a stone, the number of remaining stones being the number of soldiers that has died. There is a small hollow in the top of the pile, representing the comparatively very small number of people who returned. There are no other stones in the region for miles around.

Population

References

External links 
http://tyup.net/

Populated places in Issyk-Kul Region